Jamaran Hussainiya was the house of Ruhollah Khomeini, the founder of the Islamic Republic of Iran, in Jamaran village. On 23 January 1980, Ayatollah Khomeini went to Tehran from Qom to cure a heart ailment. According to doctors recommendation, the weather of Qom did not agree with him. The house of Khomeini was next to the Hussainiya in Jamaran village. The house was linked to a large mosque by a metal platform. Khomeini often walked up a flight of stairs leading from his house to the balcony of the mosque, from which he often spoke.

History

On 23 January 1980, Ayatollah Khomeini went to Tehran from Qom to cure a heart ailment. He was hospitalized for thirty nine days, then he resided in the north Tehran suburb of Darband. It was not a suitable house for him. On 22 April, he took up residence in Jamaran on the suggestion of Seyyed Mahdi Imam Jamarani who was known as Imam Jamarani for leading prayers at the Jamarani mosque  and spent the rest of his life there. The house was the birthplace of Imam Jamarani’s mother, located near the mosque of Jamaran in Shaheed Husseinkiya street off Yasser Road. Ayatollah Khomeini delivered speeches and met foreign delegations at Jamaran Hussainiya.

The Jamaran village is in the foothills of the Alborz mountains and north of Tehran. This village is near Niavaran Palace where Mohammad Reza Pahlavi  lived.

Ruhollah Khomeini's room
Ruhollah Khomeini's house was placed next to the Hussainiya in Jamaran village. His room, located in front of house, was about 12 square meters. A small platform adjoined the room to the Hussainiya where Ayatollah Khomeini gave his speeches to audiences. Also, he met with Eduard Shevardnadze, first secretary of the Georgian Communist Party, and foreign minister of the Soviet Union at this room.

In the news
To commemorate the death anniversary of Ayatollah Khomeini, Minister of Culture and Islamic Guidance, Ali Jannati and a number of his colleagues and artists visited the Jamaran Hussainiya.

Gallery

See also
 Mausoleum of Ruhollah Khomeini
 House of Leadership
 Imam khomeini Mosalla Tehran

References

Ruhollah Khomeini
Official residences in Iran